Jacques "Jacky" Bonnevay (born 1 June 1961) is a French football coach, currently assistant manager of AS Saint-Étienne, and former player.

Playing career
Bonnevay was born in Le Coteau, Loire. He played for FC Sochaux-Montbéliard, Olympique de Marseille, Le Havre AC, OGC Nice and Red Star.

Coaching career
After his playing career, he became a coach with AS Beauvais, Troyes AC, Angers SCO, Wydad Casablanca and Chamois Niortais FC. He joined FC Nantes in June 2009 as the reserve team manager. He left at the end of the 2009–10 season.

From October 2012 to the summer 2014, Bonnevay worked as the assistant manager of Niger's national football team. He then joined Trabzonspor under manager Vahid Halilhodžić as his assistant. The duo was fired after only four months. From March 2015 to April 2018, Bonnevay once again worked under Vahid Halilhodžić as his assistant for the Japan national team.

On 30 June 2018, he was announced as assistant manager to Claude Puel at Leicester City, following a restructure of the coaching staff at the club. On 24 February 2019, he left Leicester City following the sacking of manager Claude Puel. On 4 October 2019, Bonnevay once again followed Claude Puel, this time to AS Saint-Étienne.

External links and references

Profile

1961 births
Living people
People from Le Coteau
French expatriate sportspeople in England
Sportspeople from Loire (department)
Association football defenders
French footballers
FC Sochaux-Montbéliard players
Olympique de Marseille players
Le Havre AC players
Leicester City F.C. non-playing staff
OGC Nice players
Red Star F.C. players
Ligue 1 players
Ligue 2 players
French football managers
AS Beauvais Oise managers
ES Troyes AC managers
Angers SCO managers
Chamois Niortais F.C. managers
Wydad AC managers
French expatriate sportspeople in Morocco
Expatriate football managers in Morocco
Footballers from Auvergne-Rhône-Alpes
Botola managers